Tailwind Capital a private equity firm formerly known as Thomas Weisel Capital Partners
Thomas Weisel Partners the former parent firm of Thomas Weisel Capital Partners